Field Studies is an album by the American indie band Quasi. It was released by Up Records on September 7, 1999.

Track listing
All tracks by Sam Coomes except "Two By Two" by Janet Weiss
 "All the Same" – 4:05
 "The Golden Egg" – 5:16
 "The Skeleton" – 1:41
 "The Star You Left Behind" – 4:35
 "Empty Words" – 3:53
 "Birds" – 2:32
 "A Fable with No Moral" – 7:31
 "Under a Cloud" – 2:32
 "Me and My Head" – 3:30
 "Two by Two" – 2:04
 "It Don't Mean Nothing" – 1:48
 "Bon Voyage" – 4:01
 "Smile" – 3:29
 "Let's Just Go" – 2:10

Personnel
Sam Coomes – vocals, guitars, Roxichord, keyboards
Janet Weiss – vocals, drums
Elliott Smith – bass on "All the Same", "Empty Words", and "Under a Cloud"
Strings on "All the Same" and "Smile" by:
Brent Arnold – cello, string arrangements
Jen Charowhas – violin
Frances Woods – viola
Greg Campbell – French horn on "Smile"
Chip Butters – production assistant
Larry Crane – production
Phil Ek – production
Quasi – production
Tony Lash – mastering

References

1999 albums
Quasi albums
Domino Recording Company albums
Albums produced by Larry Crane (recording engineer)
Up Records albums
Albums produced by Phil Ek